Jorgić is a Serbian surname. Notable people with the surname include: 

 Darko Jorgić (born 1998), Slovenian table tennis player
 Nemanja Jorgić (born 1988), Serbian professional footballer
 Nikola Jorgić (1946–2014),  Bosnian Serb soldier, war criminal

Serbian surnames